Sorority Wars is a 2009 American comedy-drama television film directed by James Hayman and written by Michelle Lovretta. It stars Lucy Hale, Courtney Thorne-Smith, Phoebe Strole, Amanda Schull, Rob Mayes, and Faith Ford. The film was shot in Vancouver and premiered on Lifetime on October 17, 2009.

Premise
18-year-old Katie Parker (Lucy Hale) and her best friend Sara Snow (Phoebe Strole) are planning to rush into the Delta sorority, which was founded 27 years ago by Katie's mother Lutie (Courtney Thorne-Smith) and Summer (Faith Ford), whose own daughter Gwen (Amanda Schull) is currently in charge of the Deltas on campus. However, when Katie overhears something troubling, it drives a wedge between her and every house on Sorority Row as she is now an outcast. To counter all the hate, she joins Deltas rivalry house, but this just sparks a full-scale battle.

Cast 
 Lucy Hale as Katie Parker
 Courtney Thorne-Smith as Lutie Parker
 Amanda Schull as Gwen
 Phoebe Strole as Sara Snow
 Kristen Hager as Heather
 Rob Mayes as Beau
 Adrian Hough as William
 Sarah-Jane Redmond as Dana
 Chelan Simmons as Casadee 
 Faith Ford as Summer
 Marie Avgeropoulos as Missy
 Scott Lyster as P.J.
 Christine Willes as Mary Lee Snow
 Catherine Lough Haggquist as Hilary
 Meredith Bailey as Sally
 Diana Bang as Lauren
 Andrea Brooks as Shawna
 Natasha Gulmans as Lana

Reception
Reviews of the film were positive. Linda Stasi of the New York Post gave the movie a rating of 3.5 stars out of 4. She described it as "bizarrely entertaining in a mindless, I-need-to-veg-this-weekend kind of way." She praised lead actress Lucy Hale as "quite a talent". Writing for Variety, Brian Lowry had a similar opinion of the movie, calling it "moderately engaging" and "cheerfully mindless". He said that Hale was "very appealing".

References

External links
 
 Sorority Wars on Lifetime Movies

2009 television films
2009 films
2009 comedy-drama films
2000s English-language films
2000s teen comedy-drama films
American comedy-drama television films
American teen comedy-drama films
Films about fraternities and sororities
Films shot in British Columbia
Lifetime (TV network) films
Sonar Entertainment films
Films directed by James Hayman
2000s American films